The Yongsan bombing by the United States Air Force took place during the North Korean offensive of the Korean War and included a destructive bombing raid in Seoul. About 50 B-29s with the U.S. Fifth Air Force bombed Yongsan, Seoul on 16 July 1950. The B-29s dropped bombs on the switch yard and arsenal behind the Yongsan Station to slow down the North Korean army advance; however, some of the bombs missed the targets and hit civilian facilities. Some 1,587 citizens were killed representing 58.6% of the total civilian casualties. The South Korean Truth and Reconciliation Commission declined to investigate the incident, calling the bombing operation a military necessity.

References

Further reading
Korea bloodbath probe ends; US escapes much blame Associated Press July 11, 2010  
TRCK relaxes U.S. bombing investigation criterion under new president Observers say the organization has dropped a greater number of investigation petitions under the new conservative president Hankyoreh Jul.16,2010

Strategic bombing operations and battles
Military operations of the Korean War
Korea–United States relations
1950s in Seoul
Strategic bombing conducted by the United States
Yongsan District